The Baron is a British television series made in 1965 and 1966, based on the book series by John Creasey (written under the pseudonym Anthony Morton) and produced by ITC Entertainment. Thirty episodes were produced, and the show was exported to the American ABC network.

Overview
The show starred an American actor, Steve Forrest, as John Mannering, an antiques dealer and sometime undercover agent working in an informal capacity for the head of the fictional British Diplomatic Intelligence, Templeton-Green (Colin Gordon). He is assisted by Cordelia Winfield (Sue Lloyd) and David Marlowe (Paul Ferris).

In Creasey's original novels, Mannering is British and, after the first few novels, married. In transforming him into a bachelor and casting a Texan in the role, the producers decided that 'The Baron' would be nicknamed after the cattle ranch once run by his grandfather, described as being "200,000 acres [809.371 km2] 300 miles from Dallas". In the books he is a reformed jewel thief (the first few novels describing Mannering's "career" from his deciding to steal to his going straight) whose criminal ties served him well in investigating jewel, art, or antiques-oriented mysteries. For the TV series, Mannering's persona is depicted as absolutely straight with no suggestion of past criminality, a fact underlined by his being co-opted by British intelligence. In the episode "Red Horse, Red Rider", it is revealed that Mannering had been a US Army Captain during the Second World War, serving in the Monuments, Fine Arts, and Archives program where he recovered art works from the Nazis. Following the war, he owned three antique stores and was a "charter member of the jet set".

Cast and characters
Steve Forrest as John Mannering (alias "The Baron")
Sue Lloyd as Cordelia Winfield
Colin Gordon as John Alexander Templeton-Green
Paul Ferris as David Marlowe

Although not regular cast members, Reginald Marsh and Derek Newark also appeared in three episodes (once reprising earlier roles, and once playing different characters). Occasionally actors were used twice but in different roles in the same run of episodes, including Paul Maxwell, Peter Bowles, George Murcell and Edwin Richfield.

Production
Like other ITC shows, The Baron shared a lot of its production crew with the other productions of the time (Danger Man, The Saint etc.), including guest cast members Peter Wyngarde and Bernard Lee, and directors Roy Ward Baker and Robert Asher. The lion's share of the scripts were by Dennis Spooner and Dalek creator Terry Nation. A few episodes were credited to Tony O'Grady, a pseudonym of The Avengers writer-producer Brian Clemens.

The character of Mannering was, like Simon Templar in The Saint, a member of the jet set, whose glamorous lifestyle was typified by air travel to exotic locations, which at the time was still only easily available to the wealthy. However, filming never left the UK; it was filmed chiefly in and around Elstree Studios in Borehamwood, Hertfordshire, then owned by Associated British Pictures. Locations used included Haberdashers' Aske's School in Elstree, St Albans and Ivinghoe Beacon. These featured prominently in several other ITC series of the same era. The backlot at Elstree in particular was extensively used, being transformed alternately into Mannering's antiques shop, a Mexican town, a Parisian nightclub, an East European police station and many others besides.

Paul Ferris was originally cast as Mannering's assistant David Marlowe. However, after pressure from the US network ABC, Marlowe was dropped in favour of the more glamorous Cordelia who had appeared in the first episode. She is 'reintroduced' in "Something for a Rainy Day", the ninth episode to be made, although broadcast third. As originally broadcast, the 'Cordelia' and 'Marlowe' episodes are interspersed, even though Paul Ferris left the production after eight episodes were filmed.

As with other ITC series, the American market was vital; several episodes were overdubbed (e.g. "petrol" becoming "gas", "whisky" becoming "Scotch") to ensure they were fit for US audiences. Roy Ward Baker stated that owing to US sponsorship by a cigarette company, characters "were allowed to light up only in moments of leisure, never when they were frightened or under duress". The show did not do well enough on ABC and was syndicated midway through its run, which effectively ensured that no second series would be made.

The Baron's car was a silver Jensen CV-8 Mk II with the registration BAR 1. Unlike the Volvo driven by Simon Templar, the exclusivity of the car meant the series did not generate the same sales boost as The Saint had done for Volvo. Cordelia drove a considerably less upmarket DAF Daffodil 33. The episode "Something for a Rainy Day" featured shots of a white Jaguar plummeting over a cliff. This footage, apparently filmed for this episode (from several angles), reappeared in several other episodes and series, in an attempt to render its high cost worthwhile.

The episode "Portrait of Louisa" was a reworking by Terry Nation of his earlier script "Lida", written for (and produced as) an episode of The Saint.

The Baron was the first ITC show without marionettes to be produced entirely in colour. (ITC marionette series Stingray and Thunderbirds had been filmed in colour; the last fourteen of the thirty episodes of The Adventures of Sir Lancelot in 1956-57 had been shot in colour, as had the 1962 pilot episode of Man of the World.)

Feature films
Two films were put together for international cinema distribution by ITC; these were compiled from the two-part episodes. Mystery Island is a re-edit of the episodes "Storm Warning" and "The Island", while The Man in a Looking Glass is a combination of "Masquerade" and "The Killing". This led to further European releases in the 1960s of ITC films re-edited from episodes of The Saint, Danger Man, The Champions and Man in a Suitcase.

Episodes
Episodes were filmed between July 1965 and October 1966, on location and at Elstree Studios.

Although filmed in colour, all episodes were broadcast in the UK in black and white, colour transmissions on ITV not commencing until November 1969.

Airdate is for ATV Midlands. ITV regions varied date and order.

DVD releases
The series was released by Network Video on Region 2 and by Umbrella Video (Australia) on Region 0 DVD. Commentaries were recorded by Sue Lloyd, Johnny Goodman and Cyril Frankel, among others. Entertainment One released the complete series on Region 1 DVD on 10 March 2009.

References

External links

1960s British drama television series
Television shows shot at Associated British Studios
Television series by ITC Entertainment
ITV television dramas
American Broadcasting Company original programming
John Creasey characters
1966 British television series debuts
1967 British television series endings
Espionage television series
English-language television shows